Ahmed Daham Karim  (12 October 1967 – 29 December 2021) was an Iraqi football manager and player who played as a midfielder. He represented the Iraq national team in the 1996 Asian Cup.

Coaching career 
Daham signed for the Naft Maysan in August of the 2018–19 season, after Uday Ismail left. He led the team through good results and a very good season. He achieved fifth place in the league, six points behind third place. In the Iraqi Cup, the team went through the quarter final and was knocked out by Al-Talaba SC. Daham reached agreement with the board to stay for another season after long negotiations.

Personal life and death 
Daham died from a heart attack on 29 December 2021, at the age of 54.

Career statistics
Scores and results list Iraq's goal tally first, score column indicates score after each Daham goal.

Managerial statistics

Honours

Manager
Al-Quwa Al-Jawiya
Iraq FA Cup: 2015–16

References

External links

1967 births
2021 deaths
Iraqi footballers
Iraq international footballers
1996 AFC Asian Cup players
Association football midfielders
Al-Quwa Al-Jawiya managers
Iraqi football managers